James Stewart House, also known as Stewart's Corner, is a historic home formerly located in Lexington, Lexington County, South Carolina. It was built in 1850, and is a 1 1/2-half story, rectangular, frame cottage with a gable roof and two interior chimneys. It features a porch with a high gable supported by square wood posts. To avoid demolition, the house was moved about 1991 from its original location on West Main Street in Lexington to its current site in the vicinity of Red Bank, South Carolina.

It was listed on the National Register of Historic Places in 1983.

References

Houses on the National Register of Historic Places in South Carolina
Houses completed in 1850
Houses in Lexington County, South Carolina
National Register of Historic Places in Lexington County, South Carolina